Karan Ashley Jackson is an American actress, singer, and talk show host. She is best known as Aisha Campbell, the second Yellow Power Ranger in the Fox Kids series Mighty Morphin Power Rangers. In 1992, she was a member of the short-lived girl group K.R.U.S.H, who featured a song to the soundtrack of Mo' Money. She was known as "Ashley Jackson" at this time.

Life and career 
Ashley was born in Odessa, Texas. She is of mixed African-American and Mexican descent. Started her education at Lida Hooe Elementary in Dallas Texas and went on to graduate from David W. Carter High School in Dallas. She auditioned against thousands in a nationwide open casting call and won the role of Aisha Campbell, the second Yellow Ranger in the Fox Kids series Mighty Morphin Power Rangers, replacing the late Thuy Trang (Trini Kwan).  Her last Power Rangers appearance was in the finale of the third season of the series. In 2023, Ashley will reprise the role of Aisha Campell in the Netflix special, "Mighty Morphin Power Rangers: Once & Always", which will celebrate the 30th anniversary of the Power Rangers franchise and will also mark her character's first appearance since her departure from the series in 1996.

Ashley has made guest appearances in TV shows such as Hangin' with Mr. Cooper, Kenan & Kel, and The Parkers, Taylor's Wall. Her first film debut as an executive producer was the independent film Devon's Ghost, alongside fellow Power Rangers alumnus Johnny Yong Bosch and director Koichi Sakamoto for Gag Order Films, Inc. While she also co-wrote Devon's Ghost, her first screenplay staple came with the film Unto Thee in 1999. She co-wrote the film with Gia and Tim Grace, and also starred in the movie.

In August 2010, Ashley was invited to Power Morphicon, the second Power Rangers fan convention in Pasadena, California. In September 2011, Ashley joined the National Talk Radio Show "UnCensored Radio" (formerly "Unscripted Radio") as a regular co-host/producer and co-hosted the show with Co-Host Katrina Johnson and Jeffrey Emmette filmed "Uncensored Reality", a reality show tied into Uncensored Radio.

Currently, in 2016, she stars in the web series Class Dismissed, alongside fellow "Power Rangers" alumni Nakia Burrise and Catherine Sutherland.

In 2017, she announced that she would be starring in and producing the short film The Order and had cast many Power Rangers alumni.

Filmography

Film 
 Mighty Morphin Power Rangers: The Movie (1995)...Aisha Campbell/The Yellow Ranger
 Devon's Ghost: Legend of the Bloody Boy (2005)...Symphony
 The Order (2017)...Alyssa
 Surge of Power: Revenge of the Sequel (2017)...Herself

Television 
 In Studio 4-B (1994)...Various
 Mighty Morphin Power Rangers (1994–1996, 2023)...Aisha Campbell/The Yellow Ranger
 Mighty Morphin Power Rangers: Alpha's Magical Christmas (1994)...Aisha Campbell
 Hangin' With Mr. Cooper (1996)... Monica Carson
 Boston Common (1996-2002)...Wyleena Pritchett-Steele 
 Kenan & Kel  (1999)...Melissa—Season 4 episode 5, "The Limo"
 Power Rangers: The Lost Episode (1999)...Aisha Campbell (special episode/archival footage)
 The Steve Harvey Show (1999–2000)...Carrie McKnight (two episodes)
 The Parkers (2000)...Bride—Season 2, "Wedding Bell Blues"
 One on One (2002)...Angie—Season 1, "Me and My Shadow
 Class Dismissed (2016)...Brandy

References

External links
 http://www.myuncensoredradio.com/
 
 

20th-century American actresses
21st-century American actresses
21st-century American comedians
Actresses from Texas
African-American actresses
African-American female comedians
African-American film producers
African-American television producers
American actresses of Mexican descent
American film actresses
American stand-up comedians
American television actresses
American television producers
American women comedians
American women film producers
Living people
American women television producers
20th-century African-American women
20th-century African-American people
21st-century African-American women
Year of birth missing (living people)